Karl James Noons (born December 7, 1982) is a retired American professional mixed martial artist, as well as a former professional boxer and kickboxer. Noons competed for UFC, Strikeforce, DREAM and EliteXC. He is the former EliteXC Lightweight Champion.

Background
KJ Noons is hapa kanaka, hapa haole—mixed ethnicity of native Hawaiian (from his mother's side) and European-American (from his father's side). Born and raised in Kailua-Kona, Hawaii, Noons comes from a family history of fighting. His father Karl was a professional kickboxer and was a top contender during the time he fought. Karl's passion for fighting and competing in combat sports influenced him to introduce his son to martial arts at a young age. At the age of five, Noons started training in  martial arts. Often getting disqualified for fighting too hard in karate tournaments, Noons eventually started training in boxing and Muay Thai at the age of eight out of interest for full contact fighting. Noons competed as an amateur fighter and became the first student in the state of Hawaii to earn a junior black belt under Ed Parker at the age of 11. During his high school years, Noons moved to Houston, Texas due to the location of his father's job. While continuing to compete as a fighter, he also started playing football at Clements High School. At age 17, Noons won the ISKA Super Middleweight International Championship as an amateur in Sanshou. After winning the title and graduating from Clements High School, K.J. decided to pursue a career in combat sports, rather than go to college and continue with football.

Mixed martial arts career

PRIDE, ICON Sport, and SuperBrawl
In 2005, Noons won the PRIDE Fighting Championship's "Best Striker" auditions. Although, he never fought for the promotion, he fought for PRIDE's subleased promotion called SuperBrawl. Noons chose not to fight for PRIDE Fighting Championships because the promoters wanted to feature him in bouts against the top lightweights in the world, such as PRIDE's reigning Lightweight Champion, Takanori Gomi, and top contender, Joachim Hansen. Noons felt he was not ready to compete at the highest level that early in his career and chose a more conservative route. After three combined wins under the ICON Sport and SuperBrawl banner, Noons would move on to compete in bigger promotions.

Elite Xtreme Combat
In 2006, Noons signed a deal with promoter Gary Shaw that allowed him to participate in both boxing and mixed martial arts. Soon after, Noons was set to face former PRIDE veteran Charles Bennett in EliteXC's inaugural event in February 2007. Bennett won the bout via KO three minutes and forty-three seconds into round one, giving Noons only the second loss of his professional mixed martial arts career.

Noons rebounded from his loss to Bennett with a KO win over James Edson Berto at EliteXC's first ShoXC event. He then faced Nick Diaz for the promotion's first ever lightweight championship at EliteXC: Renegade. Noons dominated the fight using his outstanding boxing and striking against the Brazilian jiu-jitsu expert. Diaz attempted to take the fight to the ground but was unsuccessful with his takedown attempts and was also countered with a knee strike to the face on one occasion. Midway through the first round, Diaz was finally successful with a take down, but Noons got back to his feet instantly. Moments later, the referee would halt the fight and send Diaz to his corner to check on his cuts over his right eye. Diaz was given the o.k. and continued to fight. Noons would keep the fight standing and dropped Diaz with a straight right punch around the 2:07 mark of the round. After round one ended, the doctors in Diaz's corner stopped the fight due to how badly his face was cut. Noons was then be declared the winner of the fight by way of TKO due to cuts, and would become the new EliteXC Lightweight Champion.

On June 14, 2008 Noons was successful in his first and only title defense with a TKO win over Yves Edwards in Hawaii at EliteXC: Return of the King. Following the fight, Nick Diaz, who fought on the event's co-main event, stepped into the cage to confront Noons for a rematch during K.J.'s post-fight interview with Bill Goldberg. After Noons asked the fans if Diaz deserved the rematch, Diaz grabbed a hold of Goldberg's microphone and said "Don't be scared homie", which resulted in an in-cage brawl. About two months later, Noons would be stripped of the title for refusing to rematch with Diaz. The promotion would then go defunct before a new champion could be crowned.

Strikeforce and DREAM
On December 2, 2009, Noons signed with mixed martial arts promotion, Strikeforce. While Noons was still competing in professional kickboxing as a teenager, he previously fought for Strikeforce on their kickboxing fight cards before Strikeforce became a mixed martial arts promotion in 2006.

In March 2010, Noons made his Japanese debut as he represented Strikeforce at DREAM 13. In his first MMA fight in nearly two years, Noons defeated Andre Amade via unanimous decision. Noons was the aggressor for the duration of the fight, and was visibly frustrated with Amade's uncharacteristically tentative fighting style throughout the fight, which seemed to be based on a counter punching technique.

Noons was set to make his Strikeforce debut against undefeated prospect Billy Evangelista at Strikeforce: Miami, but the fight was withdrawn after Evangelista suffered an undisclosed injury during training.

Noons would then be scheduled to compete in a rematch against Charles Bennett at Strikeforce: Fedor vs. Werdum. After Bennett pulled out of the fight due to scheduling conflicts, Noons was rescheduled to face Conor Heun at Strikeforce: Los Angeles in a catchweight bout of 160 pounds, which would take place ten days before the date he was originally set to rematch Bennett. Noons would go on to win a closely contested fight by split decision.

Noons next faced Jorge Gurgel on August 21, 2010 at Strikeforce: Houston. At the weigh-ins, the day before the bout with Gurgel, Noons weighed in at 156.25 pounds, a quarter of a pound over the maximum weight limit. Gurgel accepted the fight and waived off the extra weight, so the fight was continued as a lightweight bout. As the final seconds of the first round were coming to an end, Gurgel threw a flurry of punches while Noons responded with a left hook that landed and dropped Gurgel just a split second after the bell sounded at the end of the round. The crowd reacted to what appeared to be a late punch while a wobbled Gurgel was struggling to find his corner. Right at the opening bell for round two, Noons landed a right hand followed by a left hook that dropped Gurgel to the canvas once again. Noons looked to the referee expecting a stoppage and received no response. As Noons then continued to land punches on Gurgel, he threw a knee that appeared to land to the head of a still downed opponent, finally prompting the referee to stop the fight. Replay showed that the knee Noons threw did not land, although Noons's foot tapped Gurgel on the chin as it followed through. Noons was declared the winner by TKO at 0:19 of round two.

Noons moved up one weight class to fight Nick Diaz in a grudge rematch for the Strikeforce Welterweight Championship on October 9, 2010. Noons and Diaz previously fought at EliteXC: Renegade where Noons won by TKO due to cuts.  Noons lost by unanimous decision (48-47, 49-47, 49-46), giving Noons his third career loss and first loss by decision, and beginning a losing streak for years to come. After the fight Noons revealed that he had sustained a broken jaw in the first round and a broken hand in the second.

Noons faced Jorge Masvidal at Strikeforce: Overeem vs. Werdum. Noons-Masvidal was set as a lightweight title eliminator, which would grant the winner of the bout a title shot against reigning Strikeforce Lightweight Champion, Gilbert Melendez. Originally headlining the preliminary card on HDNet, the bout was promoted to the Showtime portion of the main card after women's MMA superstar, Gina Carano, was pulled from the card. Noons went on to lose a unanimous decision.

Noons then faced Billy Evangelista at Strikeforce: Melendez vs. Masvidal in December 2011. He won the fight via unanimous decision.

Noons next faced Josh Thomson in the co-main event at Strikeforce: Tate vs. Rousey in March 2012. He lost the fight via unanimous decision.

Noons returned to face Ryan Couture at the final Strikeforce event, Strikeforce: Marquardt vs. Saffiedine, on January 12, 2013. Noons lost the fight via highly controversial split decision. All but one media outlet scored the fight for Noons, with a majority giving him every round. Couture admitted to being surprised by the verdict.  Despite the loss, Noons still moved over to the UFC.

Ultimate Fighting Championship
In January 2013, the Strikeforce organization was closed by its parent company Zuffa. A list of fighters scheduled to be brought over to the Ultimate Fighting Championship was released in mid-January and Noons was one of the fighters listed.

In his UFC debut, Noons faced Donald Cerrone on May 25, 2013 at UFC 160. He lost the fight via unanimous decision.

In his second UFC fight, Noons faced George Sotiropoulos on October 19, 2013 at UFC 166. He won via unanimous decision, earning his first win under the UFC banner.

Noons faced Sam Stout in a welterweight bout on April 16, 2014 at The Ultimate Fighter Nations Finale. Noons won the fight via knockout in the first round, earning him his first Performance of the Night bonus award.

Noons next faced Daron Cruickshank on December 12, 2014 at The Ultimate Fighter 20 Finale. After a back-and-forth first round, the fight was stopped in the second round when Cruickshank received a second inadvertent eye poke from Noons and was unable to continue. Because they had not reached the third round, the fight was declared a No Contest.

Noons was expected to face Yan Cabral at UFC Fight Night 67.  However, Cabral was forced out of the bout after contracting Dengue Fever and replaced by Alex Oliveira. Noons lost the fight via submission in the first round.

Noons faced Josh Burkman on February 6, 2016 at UFC Fight Night 82. He lost the fight by unanimous decision.

Noons was released by the company on April 14, 2016.

Personal life
Karl James Noons was given the nickname "K.J." due to his first and middle initials. Noons' first name comes from his father's first name, while his middle name comes from his grandfather's middle name.

Noons posed for a PETA advertisement campaign, speaking out against animal cruelty and encouraging people to report animal abuse to authorities. Noons is married to professional model, Melany Lorenzo.

Championships and accomplishments

Mixed martial arts
Ultimate Fighting Championship
Performance of the Night (One time)  vs. Sam Stout 
Strikeforce
2010 Fight of the Year vs. Nick Diaz on October 9
Elite Xtreme Combat
EliteXC Lightweight Championship (One time, first, last)
One successful title defense
PRIDE Fighting Championships
2005 U.S. Auditions Winner
Renegades Extreme Fighting
REF 2002 Lightweight Tournament Runner-up

Sanshou
Art of War-K. Superstar Production
Art of War Sanshou Middleweight Championship (One time)
U.S. Open International Martial Arts Championships
U.S. Open Sanshou International Middleweight Championship (One time)
International Sport Karate Association
ISKA Amateur Sanshou International Super Middleweight Championship (One time)

Karate
Long Beach International Karate Championships
1997 17 and Under Kenpō Black Belt Gold Medalist

Mixed martial arts record

|- 
|Loss
|align=center|13–9 (1)
|Josh Burkman
|Decision (unanimous)
|UFC Fight Night: Hendricks vs. Thompson
|
|align=center|3
|align=center|5:00
|Las Vegas, Nevada, United States
|   
|-
| Loss
| align=center| 13–8 (1)
| Alex Oliveira
| Submission (rear-naked choke)
| UFC Fight Night: Condit vs. Alves
| 
| align=center| 1
| align=center| 2:51
| Goiânia, Brazil
| 
|-
| NC
| align=center| 13–7 (1)
| Daron Cruickshank
| NC (accidental eye poke)
| The Ultimate Fighter: A Champion Will Be Crowned Finale
| 
| align=center| 2
| align=center| 0:25
| Las Vegas, Nevada, United States
| 
|-
| Win
| align=center| 13–7
| Sam Stout
| KO (punches)
| The Ultimate Fighter Nations Finale: Bisping vs. Kennedy
| 
| align=center| 1
| align=center| 0:30
| Quebec City, Quebec, Canada
| 
|-
| Win
| align=center| 12–7
| George Sotiropoulos
| Decision (unanimous)
| UFC 166
| 
| align=center| 3
| align=center| 5:00
| Houston, Texas, United States
| 
|-
| Loss
| align=center| 11–7
| Donald Cerrone
| Decision (unanimous)
| UFC 160
| 
| align=center| 3
| align=center| 5:00
| Las Vegas, Nevada, United States
| 
|-
| Loss
| align=center| 11–6
| Ryan Couture
| Decision (split)
| Strikeforce: Marquardt vs. Saffiedine
| 
| align=center| 3
| align=center| 5:00
| Oklahoma City, Oklahoma, United States
| 
|-
| Loss
| align=center| 11–5
| Josh Thomson
| Decision (unanimous)
| Strikeforce: Tate vs. Rousey
| 
| align=center| 3
| align=center| 5:00
| Columbus, Ohio, United States
| 
|-
| Win
| align=center| 11–4
| Billy Evangelista
| Decision (unanimous)
| Strikeforce: Melendez vs. Masvidal
| 
| align=center| 3
| align=center| 5:00
| San Diego, California, United States
| 
|-
| Loss
| align=center| 10–4
| Jorge Masvidal
| Decision (unanimous)
| Strikeforce: Overeem vs. Werdum
| 
| align=center| 3
| align=center| 5:00
| Dallas, Texas, United States
| 
|-
| Loss
| align=center| 10–3
| Nick Diaz
| Decision (unanimous)
| Strikeforce: Diaz vs. Noons II
| 
| align=center| 5
| align=center| 5:00
| San Jose, California, United States
| 
|-
| Win
| align=center| 10–2
| Jorge Gurgel
| TKO (punches)
| Strikeforce: Houston
| 
| align=center| 2
| align=center| 0:19
| Houston, Texas, United States
| 
|-
| Win
| align=center| 9–2
| Conor Heun
| Decision (split)
| Strikeforce: Los Angeles
| 
| align=center| 3
| align=center| 5:00
| Los Angeles, United States
| 
|-
| Win
| align=center| 8–2
| Andre Amade
| Decision (unanimous)
| DREAM 13
| 
| align=center| 2
| align=center| 5:00
| Yokohama, Japan
| 
|-
| Win
| align=center| 7–2
| Yves Edwards
| TKO (punches and elbows)
| EliteXC: Return of the King
| 
| align=center| 1
| align=center| 0:48
| Honolulu, Hawaii, United States
| 
|-
| Win
| align=center| 6–2
| Nick Diaz
| TKO (doctor stoppage)
| EliteXC: Renegade
| 
| align=center| 1
| align=center| 5:00
| Corpus Christi, Texas, United States
| 
|-
| Win
| align=center| 5–2
| James Edson Berto
| KO (knee)
| ShoXC: Elite Challenger Series
| 
| align=center| 3
| align=center| 0:45
| Santa Ynez, California, United States
| 
|-
| Loss
| align=center| 4–2
| Charles Bennett
| KO (punch)
| EliteXC: Destiny
| 
| align=center| 1
| align=center| 3:43
| Southaven, Mississippi, United States
| 
|-
| Win
| align=center| 4–1
| Harris Sarmiento
| TKO (punches)
| ICON Sport 44
| 
| align=center| 3
| align=center| 4:37
| Honolulu, Hawaii, United States
| 
|-
| Win
| align=center| 3–1
| Bryson Kamaka
| KO (head kick)
| SuperBrawl 41
| 
| align=center| 1
| align=center| 1:20
| Honolulu, Hawaii, United States
| 
|-
| Win
| align=center| 2–1
| Malik Williams
| TKO (punches)
| SuperBrawl 39
| 
| align=center| 1
| align=center| 2:43
| Honolulu, Hawaii, United States
| 
|-
| Loss
| align=center| 1–1
| Buddy Clinton
| Submission (heel hook)
| REF 11
| 
| align=center| 1
| align=center| 0:25
| Houston, Texas, United States
| 
|-
| Win
| align=center| 1–0
| Raul Guerra
| TKO (corner stoppage)
| REF 11
| 
| align=center| 2
| align=center| N/A
| Houston, Texas, United States
|

Professional boxing record

| style="text-align:center;" colspan="8"|11 Wins (5 knockouts, 6 decisions), 2 Losses, 0 Draws
|-
|align=center style="border-style: none none solid solid; background: #e3e3e3"|Res.
|align=center style="border-style: none none solid solid; background: #e3e3e3"|Record
|align=center style="border-style: none none solid solid; background: #e3e3e3"|Opponent
|align=center style="border-style: none none solid solid; background: #e3e3e3"|Type
|align=center style="border-style: none none solid solid; background: #e3e3e3"|Rd., Time
|align=center style="border-style: none none solid solid; background: #e3e3e3"|Date
|align=center style="border-style: none none solid solid; background: #e3e3e3"|Location
|align=center style="border-style: none none solid solid; background: #e3e3e3"|Notes
|-
| style="background: Win
| align=center|11-2
|  Julio Perez
| align=center|UD
| align=center|6
| align=center|2009-10-10
|  Arena Theatre, Houston, Texas
| 
|-
| style="background: Win
| align=center|10-2
|  Randy Pogue
| align=center|UD
| align=center|6
| align=center|2009-08-22
|  Pala Casino Spa and Resort, Pala, California
| 
|-
| style="background: Win
| align=center|9-2
|  Enrique Gallegos
| align=center|UD
| align=center|6
| align=center|2009-05-28
|  Arena Theatre, Houston, Texas
| 
|-
| style="background: Loss
| align=center|8-2
|  James Countryman
| align=center|UD
| align=center|6
| align=center|2009-03-21
|  U.S. Bank Arena, Cincinnati
| 
|-
| style="background: Win
| align=center|8-1
|  Alejandro Bogarin
| align=center|UD
| align=center|6
| align=center|2008-11-13
|  Expo Center, El Monte, California
| 
|-
| style="background: Win
| align=center|7-1
|  Anthony Cannon
| align=center|UD
| align=center|6
| align=center|2007-06-01
|  Chumash Casino, Santa Ynez, California
| 
|-
| style="background: Win
| align=center|6-1
|  Roberto Estrada
| align=center|TKO
| align=center|2 (6), 0:55
| align=center|2006-09-15
|  Quiet Cannon, Montebello, California
| 
|-
| style="background: Win
| align=center|5-1
|  Velvet Malone
| align=center|TKO
| align=center|4 (4), 1:01
| align=center|2006-05-19
|  Quiet Cannon, Montebello, California
| 
|-
| style="background: Loss
| align=center|4-1
|  Daniel Stanislavjevic
| align=center|UD
| align=center|6
| align=center|2006-02-02
|  Henry Fonda Theater, Hollywood, California
| 
|-
| style="background: Win
| align=center|4-0
|  Damon Franklin
| align=center|TKO
| align=center|3 (4), 1:24
| align=center|2005-09-22
|  Henry Fonda Theater, Hollywood, California
| 
|-
| style="background: Win
| align=center|3-0
|  Thomas Rittenbaugh
| align=center|UD
| align=center|4
| align=center|2005-08-26
|  Golden Acorn Casino, Campo, California
| 
|- 
| style="background: Win
| align=center|2-0
|  Ray Seja
| align=center|TKO
| align=center|3 (4), 1:30
| align=center|2005-06-17
|  Table Mountain Casino, Friant, California
| 
|-
| style="background: Win
| align=center|1-0
|  Ernest Lesure
| align=center|TKO
| align=center|4 (4), 2:55
| align=center|2004-06-18
|  Dodge Arena, Hidalgo, Texas
|
|-

Kickboxing record

|- bgcolor="#CCFFCC"
| 
|Win
|align=left|  Cruz Chacon
| Ring of Fire 13: Bring the Heat
|align=left|  Castle Rock, Colorado
|UD
|5
|3:00
|-
|- bgcolor="#CCFFCC"
| 
|Win
|align=left|  Ruslan Andrechyensko
| Art of War: K. Superstar USA Finals
|align=left|  Biloxi, Mississippi
|UD
|5
|3:00
|-
|- bgcolor="#CCFFCC"
| 
|Win
|align=left|  Travis Johnson
| Strikeforce
|align=left|  San Jose, California
|KO
|2
|N/A
|-
|-
|- bgcolor="#FFBBBB"
| 
|Loss
|align=left|  Rudi Ott
| ICMAC: Full Contact War
|align=left|  St. Petersburg, Florida
|UD
|5
|3:00
|-
! style=background:white colspan=9 |
|-
|-
| colspan=9 | Legend:

Film career
Noons made his film debut in the 2014 comedy Mantervention playing himself.

See also
 List of current UFC fighters
 List of male mixed martial artists

References

External links
 
 
 
 

1982 births
Living people
American male mixed martial artists
Mixed martial artists from Hawaii
Lightweight mixed martial artists
Welterweight mixed martial artists
Ultimate Fighting Championship male fighters
Boxers from Hawaii
Middleweight boxers
American male kickboxers
Kickboxers from Hawaii
Middleweight kickboxers
American male karateka
American Muay Thai practitioners
American sanshou practitioners
People from Kailua-Kona, Hawaii
American people of Native Hawaiian descent
Native Hawaiian sportspeople
Native Hawaiian people
American male boxers
Mixed martial artists utilizing sanshou
Mixed martial artists utilizing American Kenpo
Mixed martial artists utilizing boxing
Mixed martial artists utilizing Muay Thai